Donna Baringer (born February 1, 1963) is an American politician who has served in the Missouri House of Representatives from the 82nd district since 2017. She previously served on the St. Louis Board of Aldermen from 2003 to 2017, representing the 16th ward.

Electoral History

References

1963 births
Living people
Democratic Party members of the Missouri House of Representatives
21st-century American politicians
Women state legislators in Missouri
21st-century American women politicians